The Greatest Show on Earth is a 1952 American drama film produced and directed by Cecil B. DeMille, shot in Technicolor and released by Paramount Pictures. Set in the Ringling Bros. and Barnum & Bailey Circus, the film stars Betty Hutton and Cornel Wilde as trapeze artists competing for the center ring and Charlton Heston as the circus manager. James Stewart also stars as a mysterious clown who never removes his makeup, and Dorothy Lamour and Gloria Grahame also play supporting roles.

In addition to the actors, the real Ringling Bros. and Barnum & Bailey's Circus' 1951 troupe appears in the film with its complement of 1,400 people, hundreds of animals and 60 railroad cars of equipment and tents. The actors learned their circus roles and participated in the acts. The film's storyline is supported by lavish production values, actual circus acts and documentary-style views into the complex logistics behind big-top circuses.

The film won two Academy Awards for Best Picture and Best Story and was nominated for Best Costume Design, Best Director and Best Film Editing. It also won Golden Globe Awards for Best Cinematography, Best Director and Best Motion Picture – Drama.

Plot

Brad Braden is the no-nonsense general manager of the world's largest railroad circus. The show's board of directors plans to run a short 10-week season rather than risk losing money in a shaky postwar economy. Brad bargains to keep the circus on the road as long as it makes a profit, thus keeping the 1,400 performers and roustabouts employed. 

Brad reluctantly tells Holly, his aerialist girlfriend, that she will no longer be the star. He has been forced to hire world-famous aerialist (and notorious ladies' man) "The Great Sebastian" for the center ring display. Holly is heartbroken, and claims that Brad has no feelings. Trouble is also brewing for beloved Buttons the Clown, who never appears without his makeup and seems to possess medical knowledge. Holly finds a newspaper article about a mercy killer, but does not connect the doctor who killed his wife to Buttons.

Sebastian arrives, and is coldly greeted by two former lovers: Angel, who performs in the elephant act with the pathologically jealous Klaus, and Phyllis, who has a dual role as an iron jaw artist and a singer in one of the musical numbers. Sebastian is attracted to Holly, and offers her the center ring.  When Brad refuses, Holly vows to make her ring the focus of attention. 

Buttons' mother attends a performance, warning him the police are on his trail. Meanwhile, the competition between the two aerialists becomes increasingly dangerous; the duel ends when Sebastian removes his safety net, then suffers a serious fall when a stunt goes wrong. Buttons tends to him before the ambulance comes, impressing the circus' doctor. Holly finally has the center ring and star billing, but is unhappy that things turned out this way. Brad cannot comfort her, because she is now in love with Sebastian.

Brad, who runs a clean show, catches crooked midway concessionaire Harry cheating the customers. Harry is fired, vows revenge, and hangs about the periphery of the show sowing disaffection, particularly with Klaus. Several months later, Sebastian rejoins the show, but his right arm is paralyzed. A guilt-ridden Holly professes her love for Sebastian over the unfeeling Brad. Angel berates Holly for her actions, and starts a relationship with Brad herself. During one of the performances, a furious Klaus threatens to have an elephant step on Angel rather than let her go to another man. Brad intervenes to save her, and fires Klaus. 

FBI Special Agent Gregory joins the second section of the circus train hunting for the mercy killer. He shows Brad a photo of Buttons, but Brad does not recognize the image of Buttons without makeup. Later, Buttons tells Brad that Sebastian has feeling in his injured hand, a sign that his disability is not permanent. Brad makes the connection, and casually observes that Gregory will be taking fingerprints at the next stop, so Buttons can escape or lay low if he wishes.

Harry and Klaus stop the first section to rob it. Klaus sees the second train coming, and realizes that Angel is aboard. He turns his car's headlights down the track to warn the oncoming train. Unable to brake in time, the second train smashes the car, killing Klaus and Harry. It also collides with the first train, causing great damage and many casualties. 

Brad is pinned in the wreckage, bleeding from a cut artery. Buttons tries to slip away from the wreck site, but Holly, realizing whom she truly loves, begs Buttons for help. Buttons gives Brad a direct transfusion from Sebastian, who has the same rare blood type. Gregory assists Buttons, and afterwards reluctantly arrests him, telling him "You're all right." Buttons gives his dog to a child, and leaves with Gregory to face an unknown fate.

Holly takes command of the show, mounting a parade that leads the whole nearby town to an open-air performance. Brad now realizes how much he loves Holly, but she now has no time for him because the show must go on. Sebastian proposes marriage to Angel and she accepts. Holly leads the performers in an improvised "spec" around the three rings – a magnificent recovery from the disaster that ensures the circus will continue its tour.

Cast

Betty Hutton as Holly
Cornel Wilde as The Great Sebastian
Charlton Heston as Brad Braden
James Stewart as Buttons the Clown
Dorothy Lamour as Phyllis
Gloria Grahame as Angel
Henry Wilcoxon as FBI Agent Gregory
Lawrence Tierney as Mr. Henderson
Lyle Bettger as Klaus
Bob Carson as Ringmaster
John Ridgely as Assistant Manager
Frank Wilcox as Circus doctor
Brad Johnson as unnamed reporter
John Kellogg as Harry
Cecil B. DeMille as Narrator (uncredited) 
Charmienne Harker as Charmienne (uncredited)

The film features about 85 Ringling Bros. and Barnum & Bailey Circus acts, including clowns Emmett Kelly and Lou Jacobs, midget Cucciola, bandmaster Merle Evans, foot juggler Miss Loni and aerialist Antoinette Concello. John Ringling North plays himself as the owner of the circus.

The film includes several unbilled cameo appearances (mostly in the circus audiences) including Bob Hope and Bing Crosby, Lamour's costars in the Road to ... films. William Boyd appears in his usual guise of Hopalong Cassidy. Danny Thomas, Van Heflin, character actor Oliver Blake and Noel Neill are seen as circus patrons. Leon Ames is seen and heard in the train wreck sequence. A barker, kept anonymous until the film's end, is seen in the closing moments of the film. The voice is finally revealed to be that of Edmond O'Brien.

Production

The film was shot in Sarasota, Florida, where locals were paid 75 cents per hour as extras.

One story concerning the movie says that Lucille Ball was offered Gloria Grahame's role but withdrew when she discovered that she was pregnant with her first child, Lucie Arnaz. However, this account has been disputed because when DeMille was filming with Ringling Bros. and Barnum & Bailey Circus, Ball was preparing I Love Lucy for its launch on CBS.

Aerialist Art Concello, who was the general manager of Ringling Bros. at the time when DeMille was traveling with the show, figured out how to execute the stunt and doubled for Cornel Wilde in the Great Sebastian's fall scene. He had been a headlining aerialist when he was a performer.

Betty Hutton and Wilde had to learn how to fly on the trapeze for their scenes. Wilde may have faced difficulty because of his acrophobia. Hutton became quite proficient with the single bar. Film footage exists showing Hutton rehearsing 40 feet in the air, talking to DeMille who had ridden to her height on a camera crane. Hutton's stunt double was La Norma Fox, also from Ringling Bros. and Barnum & Bailey Circus.

The music for the song "Lovely Luawana Lady" was written by John Ringling North, who appears briefly as himself during the discussion about whether the show would play the road rather than have a short ten-week season. North was a nephew of the five Ringling brothers who founded Ringling Bros. and Barnum & Bailey Circus, and was its owner at the time.

Release
The film premiered at the Florida Theater (now the Sarasota Opera House) in Sarasota, Florida.

The film earned $12.8 million at the box office in the United States and Canada, making it the highest-grossing film of 1952, as well as Paramount's most successful film to that time. It was also the most popular film in Britain in 1952 and the most popular film of the year in France in 1953.

The film played for 11 weeks at New York's Radio City Music Hall, a record duration that it shared with Random Harvest in 1942 and that would last until at least the 1960s.

Critical reception

Contemporary
On the film's release, Bosley Crowther in The New York Times called The Greatest Show on Earth a "lusty triumph of circus showmanship and movie skill" and a "piece of entertainment that will delight movie audiences for years":
Sprawling across a mammoth canvas, crammed with the real-life acts and thrills, as well as the vast backstage minutiae, that make the circus the glamorous thing it is and glittering in marvelous Technicolor—truly marvelous color, we repeat—this huge motion picture of the big-top is the dandiest ever put upon the screen.

Time magazine called the film a "mammoth merger of two masters of malarkey for the masses: P. T. Barnum and Cecil B. de Mille" that "fills the screen with pageants and parades [and] finds a spot for 60-odd circus acts," but its plot "does not quite hold all this pageantry together." Variety wrote that the film "effectively serve[s] the purpose of a framework for all the atmosphere and excitement of the circus on both sides of the big canvas."

Retrospective
In 1977, Joe Walders wrote in TV Guide that a film's box-office success does not necessarily translate to continued popularity on television, and cited The Greatest Show on Earth as a primary example: "[It] was not only the top moneymaker of the year, but it also won the Academy Award for Best Picture. Yet it has rarely done well on television."

Critic Leonard Maltin opined that "like most of DeMille's movies, this may not be art, but it's hugely enjoyable."

In 2005, The Official Razzie Movie Guide: Enjoying the Best of Hollywood's Worst included The Greatest Show on Earth.

On Rotten Tomatoes, the film holds a rating of 49% from 43 reviews with the consensus: "The Greatest Show on Earth is melodramatic, short on plot, excessively lengthy and bogged down with cliches, but not without a certain innocent charm."

Awards

At the 25th Academy Awards, the movie won Oscars for Best Picture and Best Story and received nominations for Best Director, Best Film Editing and Best Costume Design, Color. It was the last Best Picture winner to win fewer than three Academy Awards until Spotlight (2015).

Some reviewers consider The Greatest Show on Earth among the weakest selections for the Academy Award for Best Picture, as it defeated highly rated films such as High Noon, The Quiet Man, Ivanhoe and the unnominated Singin' in the Rain. In 2005, Empire listed it as the third-worst Best Picture winner. MSNBC's Erik Lundegaard called Crash the "worst Best Picture winner since the 'dull, bloated' film The Greatest Show on Earth." In 2013, the selection of The Greatest Show on Earth rather than High Noon was listed by Time among the 10 most controversial Best Picture races. Premiere placed the film on its list of the 10 worst Oscar winners It holds the second-lowest spot on Rotten Tomatoes' 2011 list of the 90 films to win Best Picture (ahead of only 1929's The Broadway Melody).

Stanley Kramer alleged that the film's Best Picture Oscar was the result of the political climate in Hollywood in 1952. Senator Joseph McCarthy was pursuing communists at the time, and DeMille was a conservative Republican involved with the National Committee for a Free Europe. Another Best Picture nominee, High Noon, was produced by Carl Foreman, who would soon appear on the Hollywood blacklist, and one of the scriptwriters of Ivanhoe, Marguerite Roberts, was also blacklisted.

However, it is also possible that The Greatest Show On Earth won Best Picture because it was seen as a last chance for DeMille to win a competitive Oscar. A Hollywood legend, DeMille's best work had been done during the silent film era, before the Academy of Motion Picture Arts and Sciences was established. It is possible that the members of the Academy who were veterans of the silent era felt that he, as an elder statesman of Hollywood and one of the founders of the Academy, deserved the honor even if the other nominees for Best Picture were in some ways better than The Greatest Show On Earth.

Influence

A television series with the same title was inspired by the film, with Jack Palance in the role of Charlton Heston's character. The program ran on Tuesday evenings for 30 episodes on ABC during the 1963–1964 season.

The self-titled theme song later served as the theme for WGN-TV's long-running Bozo's Circus.

The Greatest Show on Earth was the first film that director Steven Spielberg saw, and he credits it as one of the major inspirations that led him into a film career. He identifies the film's train crash scene as a major influence, reflected in the science-fiction film Super 8 (2011), which he produced. In an early scene in Spielberg's 2005 remake of War of the Worlds, the train-wreck sequence from The Greatest Show on Earth is briefly shown on a television. The opening scene of Spielberg's 2022 semi-autobiographical film The Fabelmans dramatizes his seeing the film on the big screen, in which Sammy Fabelman (the fictional version of young Spielberg) watches it with his parents in a cinema and is mesmerized by the train-wreck sequence.

References

External links

 
 
 

1950s English-language films
1952 drama films
1952 films
American drama films
Best Drama Picture Golden Globe winners
Best Picture Academy Award winners
Circus films
Films about euthanasia
Films directed by Cecil B. DeMille
Films scored by Victor Young
Films shot in Philadelphia
Films that won the Academy Award for Best Story
Films whose director won the Best Director Golden Globe
Paramount Pictures films
Rail transport films
Ringling Bros. and Barnum & Bailey Circus
Cultural depictions of P. T. Barnum
1950s American films
Films shot in Florida